Paul Merlo is an Australian former professional rugby league footballer who played in the 1970s and 1980s. A New South Wales State of Origin representative forward, he played his club football in the New South Wales Rugby League (NSWRL) competition for the Penrith Panthers, Western Suburbs Magpies and the Cronulla-Sutherland Sharks.

Merlo was selected to represent New South Wales as a second-rower for Game III of the 1982 State of Origin series.

Merlo later worked as a regional manager for Cetnaj Lighting Electrical and Data. Based at Cardiff, New South Wales, he also became the head coach of the South Newcastle Lions in the Newcastle Rugby League competition.

In 2010 Merlo was named in a South Newcastle Lions team of the century. This is the same club Paul played his junior football at.

In 2010, Merlo was named as a member of the Western Suburbs Magpies' Team of the Eighties.

Is now a keen foiler and can be found down at Fingal bay

References

Sources
 

1955 births
Living people
Australian rugby league players
New South Wales Rugby League State of Origin players
Penrith Panthers players
Cronulla-Sutherland Sharks players
South Newcastle Lions players
Rugby league locks
Rugby league players from New South Wales
Western Suburbs Magpies players